The lánytánc is a Hungarian folk dance similar to the karikázó in that it is a women's circle dance in  time. Unlike the karikázó, the dance is performed to instrumental rather than vocal music.

References

Hungarian dances
Circle dances